Zaruiyeh-ye Sofla (also Romanized as Zārū’īyeh-ye Soflá; also known as Zārū’īyeh and Zārū’īyeh-ye Pā’īn) is a village in Jowzam Rural District, Dehaj District, Shahr-e Babak County, Kerman Province, Iran. At the 2006 census, its population was 76, in 15 families.

References 

Populated places in Shahr-e Babak County